Jane Elizabeth Healy (born May 9, 1949) is an American journalist. She was the recipient of the Orlando Sentinel’s first Pulitzer Prize.

Early life and education
Healy was born on May 9, 1949, in Washington, D.C., to parents Paul and Connie. She graduated from Bethesda-Chevy Chase High School in 1967 and attended the University of Maryland where she earned a Bachelor of Science degree in 1971.

Career
After earning her bachelor's degree, Healy accepted a position as a copy aide at the New York Daily News, before moving to Florida to work for the Orlando Sentinel. In 1988, Healy became the first Sentinel writer to receive the Pulitzer Prize for Editorial Writing, for her series on the protesting against overdevelopment in Florida's Orange County. She was later awarded The Paul Hansell Award for Distinguished Achievement in Florida Journalism.

Healy eventually became the Sentinel's vice president and editorial page editor.

References

Living people
1949 births
Journalists from Washington, D.C.
University of Maryland, College Park alumni
American women journalists
Pulitzer Prize for Editorial Writing winners
20th-century American journalists
Orlando Sentinel people
20th-century American women
21st-century American women